Thomas Harold Ponting (born January 28, 1965) is a Canadian former competitive swimmer who specialized in the butterfly stroke.  Ponting competed in three consecutive Summer Olympics for Canada starting with the 1984 Summer Olympic Games in Los Angeles, California.  At every occasion he won a medal with the men's 4 × 100 m medley relay team: two silver and one bronze.

At the Canadian Interuniversity Sport (CIS) swimming championships in 1989, Ponting broke the world and Canadian records in the 100-metre butterfly, with a time of 52.62 seconds.  The record still stands as the CIS record.

Ponting is the only swimmer in Canadian history to win three Olympic medals in three different Olympic Games (1992, 1988 and 1984).

World Record Short Course: 
4 × 100 m medley relay (1991)
4 × 100 m medley relay (1992) 
100 m butterfly - 52.62 (1989)

See also
 List of Commonwealth Games medallists in swimming (men)
 List of Olympic medalists in swimming (men)
 World record progression 4 × 100 metres medley relay

External links
 

1965 births
Living people
Canadian male butterfly swimmers
Commonwealth Games gold medallists for Canada
World record setters in swimming
Medalists at the 1984 Summer Olympics
Medalists at the 1988 Summer Olympics
Medalists at the 1992 Summer Olympics
Olympic silver medalists for Canada
Olympic bronze medalists for Canada
Olympic bronze medalists in swimming
Olympic swimmers of Canada
Pan American Games silver medalists for Canada
Swimmers from Montreal
Swimmers at the 1983 Pan American Games
Swimmers at the 1984 Summer Olympics
Swimmers at the 1986 Commonwealth Games
Swimmers at the 1988 Summer Olympics
Swimmers at the 1990 Commonwealth Games
Swimmers at the 1992 Summer Olympics
Olympic silver medalists in swimming
Commonwealth Games medallists in swimming
Pan American Games medalists in swimming
Universiade medalists in swimming
Anglophone Quebec people
Universiade bronze medalists for Canada
Medalists at the 1983 Summer Universiade
Medalists at the 1983 Pan American Games
Medallists at the 1986 Commonwealth Games
Medallists at the 1990 Commonwealth Games